TSS Scotia was a twin screw steamer passenger vessel operated by the London and North Western Railway from 1902 to 1923.

History

She was built by William Denny and Brothers of Dumbarton for the London and North Western Railway in 1902.

She was requisitioned by the Admiralty as an Armed boarding steamer in 1914.

She was renamed TSS Menevia in 1920. In 1928 she was sold to the Isle of Man Steam Packet Company and scrapped later that year by Thos. W. Ward.

References

1902 ships
Passenger ships of the United Kingdom
Steamships
Ships built on the River Clyde
Ships of the London and North Western Railway
Ferries of the Isle of Man
Armed boarding steamers of the Royal Navy